The 2008 Speedway Grand Prix Qualification or GP Challenge was a series of motorcycle speedway meetings used to determine the 3 riders that would qualify for the 2008 Speedway Grand Prix.

Calendar 
 - Domestic
 - Quarter-finals
 - Semi-finals
 - Final

Domestic Qualification

Poland 
Golden Helmet Final (Finał Złotego Kasku)
June 6, 2007
 Bydgoszcz, Polonia Stadium
Referee:  Ryszard Bryła (Zielona Góra)
Attendance: 2,500
Best Time: 61,63 s. - Wiesław Jaguś (7 heat)
Only 16 heats, because was rain.

Paweł Hlib was injured before Quarter-Final and was replaced by Tomasz Gapiński. Wiesław Jaguś (8th) and Sebastian Ułamek (9th) refused.

Quarter-finals

Semi-finals

Grand Prix Challenge 
September 15, 2007 (Saturday, 19:30)
 Vojens
Referee: 
Jury President: 
Attendance: 
Best Time: 
Stadium and track:
Name: Speedway Center
Capacity: ?
Length: ?

Heat after heat 
 Pedersen, Baliński, Kroner, Davidsson
 Iversen, Bjerre, Dryml, Schlein
 Tomíček, Lindgren, Dobrucki, Johnston
 Gafurov, Gizatullin, Kasprzak, Legault (F/X)
 Bjerre, Baliński, Johnston, Legault
 Dryml, Gafurov, Lindgren, Kroner
 Dobrucki, Davidsson, Kasprzak, Schlein
 Iversen, Tomíček, Pedersen, Gizatullin
 Dobrucki, Dryml, Baliński, Gizatullin
 Bjerre, Tomíček, Kasprzak, Kroner
 Iversen, Johnston, Davidsson, Gafurov
 Pedersen, Lindgren, Schlein, Legault
 Tomíček, Gafurov, Schlein, Baliński (E/start)
 Iversen, Dobrucki, Legault, Kroner (E4)
 Davidsson, Lindgren, Gizatullin, Bjerre (F/X)
 Dryml, Kasprzak, Pedersen, Johnston
 Kasprzak, Iversen, Gjedde, Lindgren (F/X)
 Gizatullin, Schlein, Kroner, Johnston
 Dryml, Davidsson, Tomíček, Legault
 Pedersen, Bjerre, Dobrucki, Gafurov Play-off 3-4 place:
 Pedersen, Tomíček

Top three riders qualified to 2008 Speedway Grand Prix:
  Niels Kristian Iversen
  Lukáš Dryml
  Bjarne Pedersen

References

See also 
Speedway Grand Prix

2008

World Individual